Anugraham is a 1977 Indian Malayalam film, directed by Melattoor Ravi Varma and produced by Melattoor Ravi Varma. The film stars Prem Nazir, Jayabharathi, KPAC Lalitha and Pattom Sadan in the lead roles. The film has musical score by Shankar–Ganesh.

Plot
This film tells the story of the Brahmin Parashuram who meets the sage Konduraswamy and receives a boon: in exchange for a vow of celibacy he receives a root which enables him to terminate pregnancies. Parashuram's wife (Vanisree) reluctantly goes along with her husband's new convictions and soon he becomes known as a holy man.

Cast

Prem Nazir as Rajan
Jayabharathi as Jyothi
 Bahadoor
Vincent as Ravi
Radha Saluja as Sharada
T. R. Omana as Kamakshiyamma
KPAC Lalitha as Pankajakshiyamma
Pattom Sadan as Mathew
Radhika
 Kedamangalam Ali
 Ragava Menon
 Paramu
 Nedumangadu Krishnan
 O. Ramdas
Prathapachandran as Principal
Veeran as Joseph contractor
K. P. Ummer as Sreedhara Menon
Kunchan as Padmalojanan
Kunjava
Master Raghu as young Rajan
Meena as Ravi's Aunty 
Oduvil Unnikrishnan as Unnnikrishnan School master
P. K. Abraham as Krishnan
Pala Thankam as School teacher
Paravoor Bharathan as Rowdi Kuttan nair
Chithra as student at school 
P. K. Abraham as Krishnan
T. P. Madhavan as Collector T. P. Madhavan

Soundtrack
The music was composed by Shankar–Ganesh and the lyrics were written by Mankombu Gopalakrishnan, Vayalar Ramavarma and P. Bhaskaran.

References

External links
 

1977 films
1970s Malayalam-language films
Films scored by Shankar–Ganesh